Liu Jingmin (Chinese: 刘敬民;  b. January 1952) is the Vice Mayor of Beijing, and Executive Vice President of the Beijing Organizing Committee for the Games of the XXIX Olympiad.

Biography and career
 He graduated from Beijing 101 Middle School and Renmin University of China (majoring in Economics).
 Liu was also involved in Beijing's Olympic bid as Executive Vice President of the Beijing 2008 Olympic Games Bid Committee.
 Current Vice Mayor of Beijing.

References

1952 births
People's Republic of China politicians from Hebei
Living people
Recipients of the Olympic Order
Political office-holders in Beijing